Andreas Bakkerud (born 10 October 1991) is a rallycross driver from Bergen, Norway. He has competed in the FIA Rallycross Supercar class since 2013 in both Euro RX and World RX, and Nitro Rallycross since 2021. He became European Champion in 2021.

Biography

Bakkerud won the FIA European Rallycross Championship in the Super1600 category twice, in 2011 and 2012.

He entered the FIA European Rallycross Supercar class in 2013 with a private Citroën DS3, finishing fourth with two wins.

In 2014 he joined the FIA World Rallycross Championship Supercar class, driving a Ford-supported Olsbergs MSE Fiesta. He got two wins and three second-place finishes, and placed fifth in the overall standings. In 2015 he scored a win, three podiums and eight top 5s, which put him fourth in the Supercar drivers championship.

In 2016 Bakkerud moved to American outfit Hoonigan Racing Division, partnering team boss Ken Block. He claimed three wins and six podiums, earning a third place in the 2016 FIA World Rallycross Supercar standings.

On June 12, 2016 Bakkerud made rallycross history in Hell, Norway, during Round Five of the 2016 FIA World Rallycross Championship by dominating the entire event and bringing home a 1st overall finish.
Bakkerud set numerous records on his outright domination that weekend by winning all four of his Qualifier races (no driver had ever won all four in a weekend previously) and then going on to storm to the top in both his Semi-final and the Final. The overall win was the first-ever for the all-new Ford Focus RS RX rallycross car that year (a racecar that was still in its first year of competition and development), the first-ever in World RX for Hoonigan Racing Division and the first-ever win at the Norway round of the World Championship by a Norwegian.

With the announcement that Hoonigan Racing would be withdrawing from the sport at the end of the 2017 season, Bakkerud was left to find a drive for the new season, an on 31 January 2018 announced that he would be joining the EKS Audi Sport team, driving an Audi S1 EKS RX quattro. He finished third in the 2018 season behind the dominant Volkswagens of Johan Kristoffersson and Petter Solberg, scoring six podiums, before EKS too pulled out of the championship.

Bakkerud would remain in World RX for 2019, teaming up with Liam Doran in the Monster Energy RX Cartel team, using the EKS Audi's.

Racing record

Complete FIA European Rallycross Championship results
(key)

Division 1A

Super1600

Supercar

Complete FIA World Rallycross Championship results
(key)

Supercar

Complete Nitro Rallycross results

Supercar

Group E

Complete 24H GT Series results

GT4

References

External links
 - Andreas Bakkerud Website
 - Hoonigan Racing

1991 births
Living people
Global RallyCross Championship drivers
Norwegian rally drivers
Sportspeople from Bergen
European Rallycross Championship drivers
World Rallycross Championship drivers
Dreyer & Reinbold Racing drivers
Audi Sport drivers
24H Series drivers